The following is a list of MTV Pilipinas winners for Best Director.

References

MTV Pilipinas Music Awards